EU Andromedae (often abbreviated to EU And) is a carbon star in the constellation Andromeda. Its apparent visual magnitude varies in an irregular manner between 10.7 and 11.8.

Infrared observations of EU Andromedae show the presence of silicate grains, indicating the presence of an oxygen-rich circumstellar shell around the star, a combination known as a silicate star. Subsequently, a water maser was detected around this star (and for the first time around a carbon star), confirming the existence of the shell. The most recent observations suggest that the maser originated in a circumstellar disc, seen nearly edge-on, around an unseen companion with a minimum mass of 0.5 . Carbon dioxide has been detected for the first time in a silicate carbon star around EU Andromedae.

EU Andromedae is given as the standard star for the C-J5− spectral class. A more complete spectral type includes the abundance indices C25 j3.5, which indicate the Swan band strength and the isotopic band ratio.

References

Andromeda (constellation)
Andromedae, EU
J23195888+4714345
Carbon stars
Slow irregular variables